Jonas Svensson (born June 27, 1983) is a Swedish Bandy player who currently plays for Ljusdals BK as a goalkeeper.  Jonas was developed at Ljusdals BK and have after that played for a lot of clubs. In April 2008 he signed, together with Hammarbys other goalkeeper Patrik Nordgaard, a new two-year contract (with option for a third) with Hammarby. He returned home to Ljusdal in summer of 2009.  

Jonas has played for many clubs.
His list of clubs are as follows-
 Ljusdals BK (1999-2003)
 Hammarby IF Bandy (2003-2006)
 Sköndals IK (2003-2005)
 GT-76 (2005-2006)
 Sandvikens AIK (2006-2007)
 Hammarby IF Bandy (2007-2009)
 Ljusdals BK (2009-)

External links
  jonas svensson at bandysidan
  sandvikens aik

1983 births
Living people
Swedish bandy players
Ljusdals BK players
Hammarby IF Bandy players
Sandvikens AIK players